Arthrobacter livingstonensis is a species of bacteria. It is psychrotolerant, halotolerant, Gram-positive, motile and facultatively anaerobic. It possesses a rod–coccus cycle.

References

Further reading
Whitman, William B., et al., eds. Bergey's manual® of systematic bacteriology. Vol. 5. Springer, 2012.

External links

LPSN
Type strain of Arthrobacter livingstonensis at BacDive -  the Bacterial Diversity Metadatabase

Micrococcaceae
Psychrophiles
Bacteria described in 2011